Liuliqiaodong is a station on Line 9 of the Beijing Subway. It is located along Guang'an Road to the northeast of Liuliqiao, the intersection between the 3rd Ring Road and the northern terminus of the G4 Beijing–Hong Kong and Macau Expressway.

Station Layout 
The station has an underground island platform.

Exits 
There are 3 exits, lettered C, D, and E. Exit C is accessible.

References

External links 

Beijing Subway stations in Fengtai District
Railway stations in China opened in 2011